Rodgers Lee Grant (January 18, 1936 – April 12, 2012) was an American jazz pianist, composer, and lyricist. After working with saxophonist Hugo Dickens in the 1950s, he became pianist for Mongo Santamaría in the 1960s. In 1963, Grant wrote the hit "Yeh! Yeh!" with Pat Patrick. Jon Hendricks wrote lyrics for the song and recorded it with Lambert and Bavan at the Newport Jazz Festival of 1963. Georgie Fame and the Blue Flames had a hit with the song in 1965.

Trombonist Scott Whitfield recorded two of Grant's compositions on Scott Whitfield Jazz Orchestra East – Live at Birdland (2004).

Grant served in the United States Army.

Grant moved to Paulding, Ohio in 2006 and died on April 12, 2012, at the age of 76 in Defiance, Ohio.

References

External links

1935 births
2012 deaths
20th-century American composers
20th-century American pianists
American jazz composers
American jazz pianists
American jazz songwriters
American male pianists
American male songwriters
American male jazz composers
People from Paulding, Ohio
United States Army soldiers
Jazz musicians from Ohio
20th-century American male musicians
20th-century jazz composers